The Ford Model 91 is a car that was made by Ford UK in 1939 and was the last of the British pre-war V-8 range that had started with the V8 18 in 1932. In total, 1,878 were made. For the British market it was available as a 2-door convertible, a 2 door, 5-seat estate and a 4-door, 4-seat saloon. It was powered by a 3622 cc Ford Sidevalve V8 and still used the transverse leaf suspension pioneered on the Model T. 

The Model 91 was also license built by Ford-Vairogs in Latvia as Ford-Vairogs V8 De Luxe.

References
 A-Z of Cars of the 1930s. M Sedgwick, Bay View Books. 1989. 

Model 91
Cars introduced in 1939